Bohbot Kids Network (more commonly referred to and on-screen as BKN, originally known as Amazin' Adventures until 1997) is a children's programming block operated by Bohbot Entertainment (later BKN, Inc.) that aired on syndicated television stations from September 13, 1992.

History

Amazin' Adventures
On September 13, 1992, Bohbot Entertainment launched Amazin' Adventures, a syndicated programming block that aired for two hours on Sundays. Byrne Enterprises sold barter for the block. During the 1996–1997 season, Amazin' Adventures also aired for an hour on weekdays.

BKN (Bohbot Kids Network)
Amazin' Adventures was re-launched as Bohbot Kids Network (BKN) in September 1997. By 1997, the network had signed up 104 stations reaching 75% of the US, with 65 stations airing BKN in pattern and 35 stations signing on for three years. Stations that aired the BKN block included BHC Communications stations, WCIU-TV, WPGH-TV, and The WB 100+ Station Group. During BKN's first season, its programs were split into three blocks: the "Extreme Block" (Extreme Dinosaurs and Extreme Ghostbusters) and the "Comedy Block" (The Mask: Animated Series and Adventures of Sonic the Hedgehog) on weekdays, and "Amazin’ Adventures" (Captain Simian & the Space Monkeys) on weekends.

Bulldog TV
On July 16, 1999, BKN announced that their main syndicated service would be relaunched as an action-oriented block. on August 29th. The service was internally named "Bulldog TV" because the block's bumpers featured an animated bulldog. Bulldog TV focused on action cartoons taken from Bohbot's existing catalog and acquired shows mainly from DIC, broken up into two-hour-long blocks that aired on Weekdays and Sundays. Existing BKN shows Mummies Alive!, Double Dragon, Street Sharks, Jumanji, Beakman's World, and Captain Simian & the Space Monkeys made it to the rebranded service. Three new shows were also added: two new original shows Roswell Conspiracies: Aliens, Myths and Legends and Roughnecks: Starship Troopers Chronicles and DIC-acquired faire Sonic Underground.

Bulldog TV stopped airing on most stations in 2000, but The WB 100+ Station Group continued to air reruns of BKN shows during the 2000–2001 season. During this time, BKN had their shows aired on the Sci-Fi Channel on weekday mornings.

Programming
 Saban's Around the World in Eighty Dreams (1992–1993)
 Saban's Gulliver's Travels (1992–1993)
 The Wizard of Oz (1992–1993)
 King Arthur and the Knights of Justice (1992–1996)
 Double Dragon (1993–1996, 1999–2000)
 Hurricanes (1993–1994)
 Mighty Max (1993–1994, 1998–1999)
 Starcom: The U.S. Space Force (1994)
 Turbocharged Thunderbirds (1994–1995)
 Street Sharks (1995–1997, 1999–2000)
 Adventures of Sonic the Hedgehog (1995–1996, 1997–1998)
 Gadget Boy and Heather (1995–1996)
 Princess Gwenevere and the Jewel Riders (1995–1997)
 A.J.'s Time Travelers (1995–1996)
 Ultraforce (1995–1996)
 Skysurfer Strike Force (1995–1997)
 Captain Simian & the Space Monkeys (1996–1998)
 The Mask: Animated Series (1996–1998)
 Extreme Dinosaurs (1997–1998)
 Extreme Ghostbusters (1997–2000)
 Jumanji (1998–1999)
 Pocket Dragon Adventures (1998–1999)
 Mummies Alive! (1998–2000)
 Sonic Underground (1999–2000)
 Monster Rancher (1999–2001)
 Rambo: The Force of Freedom (1999–2000)
 Roughnecks: Starship Troopers Chronicles (1999–2000)
 Roswell Conspiracies: Aliens, Myths and Legends (1999–2000)

BKN Kids II

BKN Kids II (branded as BKN on-air) is a children's programming block operated by Bohbot Entertainment that aired in syndication from August 29, 1999 to October 20, 2000.

History 
With multiple offers in top 50 markets for the Bohbot Kids Network, Bohbot Entertainment scheduled the launch of a second syndication network, BKN Kids II, for September 1998 to meet the demand. BE also looked for shows from other syndicators to include in BKN Kids II. With financial setbacks that had happened in the past, a consortium of banks gave Bohbot $100 million in new financing in September 1998. Two new blocks were announced at the same time as well as the new chairman/CEO of Bohbot Kids Network, Rick Ungar. BKN also indicated that long-term network affiliation agreements were under close to being finalized with Chris-Craft/United Television, Tribune Broadcasting, Paramount Stations Group, Sinclair Broadcast Group and the WB network's WeB fill-in cable network. Station groups affiliating with BKN 2 at launch included Sinclair Broadcast Group, Tribune Broadcasting, Clear Channel Communications and ACME Communications. 

The block's launch was postponed to August 29, 1999, coinciding with the main BKN service's rebranding as the action-focused Bulldog TV. Because both services could not initially share programming in order to grant Syndex protection, BKN Kids II functioned as a more mainstream block focusing on a broader audience encompassing both boys and girls 2-11. Much of the programming formerly seen on the main service was moved to Kids II, with shows such as Mighty Max, Highlander: The Animated Series, The Mask: The Animated Series, and Adventures of Sonic the Hedgehog filling out the schedule.

As with Bulldog TV, BKN Kids II ceased broadcast on October 20, 2000.

Programming
 Adventures of Sonic the Hedgehog
 Beakman's World
 Captain Simian & the Space Monkeys
 Extreme Dinosaurs
 Highlander: The Animated Series
 Jumanji
 King Arthur and the Knights of Justice
 Mighty Max
 Pocket Dragon Adventures
 Skysurfer Strike Force
 Sonic Underground

References 

First-run syndicated television programs in the United States
Television programming blocks in the United States